Bangles may refer to:

Bangle, jewellery
The Bangles, an American pop rock band
Bangles (EP), a 1982 EP by the Bangles
Bangles (film), a 2013 Indian Malayalam-language film

See also
"Baubles, Bangles & Beads", a song from the 1953 musical Kismet
Chris Bangle (born 1956), American automobile designer